Joseph Shannon or Joe Shannon may refer to:

 Joe Shannon (politician) (1867–1943),  U.S. Representative from Missouri
 Joseph A. Shannon (1859–1934), architect in Devils Lake, North Dakota
 Joe Shannon (baseball) (1897–1955), Major League Baseball player
 Joe Shannon (artist) (born 1937), Puerto Rican artist